Xi'an Economic and Technological Development Zone is a state-level economic development zone in Xi'an, Shaanxi, China. The zone was established in 2000. It is located at North Gate of Xi'an with its developed area of 4.9 square kilometres.

The zone attracts many foreign investments in there, such as Coca-Cola, General Motors, HP, Mitsubishi Electric, ABB Group, Rolls-Royce, Taikoo Group, Siemens and Ting Hsin. The pillar industries in there include mechanicals, electronics, light industry, foods, bio-pharmaceuticals, new materials and high-tech products.

References

External links
Xi'an Economic and Technological Development Zone (Chinese Version)

2000 establishments in China
Economy of Xi'an
Special Economic Zones of China